Yvonne Manzi Makolo Andrew is a Rwandan IT specialist and , who serves as the managing director and chief executive officer of Rwandair, the national airline of Rwanda. She was appointed to that position on 6 April 2018. Prior to that, she served as the Deputy CEO responsible for corporate affairs at the same airline, from April 2017 until April 2018.

Background and education
She was born in Rwanda. In 1993, she voluntarily migrated to Canada. Ten years later, in 2003 she returned to her native Rwanda. She and her older sister were raised by a single mother, Yvonne's father having died when the daughters were very young. Her sister is the Rwandan government spokeswoman Yolande Makolo. Makolo has specialized training in information technology and has worked as a software developer, both in Canada and Rwanda.

Career
In 2006, she joined MTN Rwanda, a leading telecommunications service provider in the country. Over time, she rose through the ranks to the position of chief marketing officer (CMO) and also concurrently served as the chief executive officer (CEO), in an acting capacity.

In April 2017, when the Cabinet of Rwanda made management changes at Rwandair, Makolo was appointed Deputy CEO, responsible for Corporate Affairs. One year later, in another managerial change at the national airline, she was appointed to the position of managing director and chief executive officer at Rwandair.

In November 2021, Makolo was interviewed by the International Air Transport Association (IATA). During that interview, she was  asked what it will take for African aviation to revive. She believes governments must provide more support for aviation. "However, this does not always imply financial assistance".

Other responsibilities
Makolo is a mother of young children.

Awards and recognition 
In June 2022, Makolo was recognized by the International Hospitality Institute on the Global 100 in Hospitality, a list featuring the 100 Most Powerful People in Global Hospitality.

See also
 Transport in Rwanda
 List of airports in Rwanda

References

External links
 Website of Rwandair
 Kagame appoints new ministers As of 6 April 2018.

Living people
Year of birth missing (living people)
Rwandan businesspeople
Rwandan business executives
Women chief executives
Rwandan chief executives
Rwandan women in business